Leslie "Bugs" Allen (5 March 1892 in Odell, Illinois – 19 May 1946 in Chicago, Illinois) was an American racecar driver. Allen attempted to qualify for the 1927 Indianapolis 500 but failed to qualify. He successfully qualified for the 1930 Indianapolis 500 driving a Miller and started and finished 9th. Allen later worked as a mechanic, secret policeman and bank teller in Chicago.

Indy 500 results

External links
http://www.oldracingcars.com/driver/Leslie_Allen

1892 births
1946 deaths
Racing drivers from Chicago
Indianapolis 500 drivers
People from Odell, Illinois